Roger G. Ibbotson (born May 27, 1943) is Professor Emeritus in Practice of Finance at the Yale School of Management. He is also chairman of Zebra Capital Management LLC.  He has written extensively on capital market returns, cost of capital, and international investment.  He is the founder, advisor, and former chairman of Ibbotson Associates, now a Morningstar Company. He has written numerous books and articles including Stocks, Bonds, Bills, and Inflation with Rex Sinquefield, which serves as a standard reference for information and capital market returns.

Professor Ibbotson conducts research on a broad range of financial topics, including popularity, liquidity, investment returns, mutual funds, international markets, portfolio management, and valuation. He has recently published Popularity: A Bridge between Classical and Behavioral Finance and Lifetime Financial Advice. He has also co-authored two books with Gary Brinson, Global Investing and Investment Markets. He is a regular contributor and editorial board member to both trade and academic journals.

Professor Ibbotson served on numerous boards and has recently retired as a director, Chairman of the Audit Committee and member of the Nominating Committee of the Dimensional Investment Group Inc. and DFA Investment Dimensions Group Inc., registered investment companies for which Dimensional Fund Advisors Inc. serves as investment adviser.  He frequently speaks at universities, conferences, and other forums. He received his bachelor's degree in mathematics from Purdue University, his MBA from Indiana University, and his PhD from the University of Chicago, where he taught for 13 years, and served as executive director of the Center for Research in Security Prices.

Academic Appointments
Professor Emeritus in Practice  of Finance, Yale School of Management, 2013 to Present
Professor in Practice of Finance, Yale School of Management, 1984 to 2013
Senior Lecturer in Finance, University of Chicago, Graduate School of Business, 1979 to 1984
Executive Director, Center for Research in Security Prices, University of Chicago, 1979 to 1984
Assistant Professor of Finance, University of Chicago, Graduate School of Business, 1975 to 1979
Lecturer in Finance, University of Chicago, Graduate School of Business, 1971 to 1975

Selected books
Stocks, Bonds, Bills, and Inflation (SBBI®) Yearbooks R.G. Ibbotson Morningstar, Inc. (2007-2015); Duff & Phelps, Wiley (2016)
Lifetime Financial Advice: Human Capital, Asset Allocation, and Insurance, R. G. Ibbotson, M. A. Milevsky, P. Chen and K. X. Zhu
The Equity Risk Premium: Essays and Explorations, W. N. Goetzmann and R. G. Ibbotson Oxford University Press, USA 2006  
Historical US Treasury Yield Curves 1926-1992, T. S. Coleman, L. Fisher, and R. G. Ibbotson Ibbotson Associates, Chicago 1994

Awards and nominations
 Markowitz Award Prize for 2015 Best Article in Journal of Investment Management,selected by Nobel Prize Winners Harry M. Markowitz, Robert C. Merton, Myron S. Scholes, and William F. Sharpe
 Graham and Dodd 2014 Award for Best article in Financial Analysts Journal
 Financial Analysts Journal, Graham and Dodd Scrolls, 1979, 1982, 1985, 2001, 2004, 2007, 2012, 2013;
 Best Perspectives Article 2011
 Whitebox Advisors Best Research Paper 2011 Finalist
 Investment Advisor, “Thirty for Thirty Most Influential People,” 2010
 Portable Alpha Board of Governors’ Hall of Fame, 2006
 Alternative Investment Summit, The Paper of the Year Award, 2006
 Pensions & Investments, one of 20 people who "literally changed pension funds, institutional investing and/or money management", 2003
 Journal of Financial Economics, All-Star Paper, 2002
 AIMR 2001 James R. Vertin Award for research notable for enduring value and relevance to investment practitioners
 Academy of Alumni Fellows, Indiana University Kelley School of Business, 2001
 Worth's Magazine “Wall Street’s 25 Smartest Players,” 1999
 Co-Winner, 1992 Review of Financial Studies Award
 Investment Education Institute, Distinguished Service Award in the field of Economics, 1986

External links
Roger G. Ibbotson at Yale School of Management
Published Papers at the Social Science Research Network
Zebra Capital Management, LLC
Ibbotson Associates

Indiana University alumni
Purdue University alumni
University of Chicago Booth School of Business alumni
Yale School of Management faculty
Living people
1943 births